Shukhrat Maqsudov is a former Uzbekistan footballer, who played for Pakhtakor and FK Neftchi in Uzbek League in position of the forward.

Playing career

Club

Maqsudov was born in Uzbekistan and started his professional career at local Angren club, Tashkent Province. 1991 he moved to Pakhtakor and started to play first for reserve team of the club and later for main team. In 1993 season Pakhtakor finished runner-up after Neftchi Farg'ona and Maqsudov became third best top scorer of season, scoring 15 goals in league matches.  
In 1997, he moved to FK Neftchi, where he finished his football career as player. After he worked as coach in FK Neftchi.

International

Shukhrat Maqsudov belongs to the golden generation of Uzbekistan national team, which won Asian Games 1994. In final match Uzbekistan won China with 4:2 and Maqsudov scored last goal of uzbek side.

Managing career
Maqsudov started his coaching career in 2001 at Neftchi Farg'ona as assistant coach to Yuriy Sarkisyan. He participated in 2011 AFC Asian Cup as assistant trainer to Vadim Abramov with Uzbekistan national team. After Vadim Abramov was sacked, Maqsudov remained assistant coach of national team to Mirjalol Qosimov. On 6 December 2013 he was named by UFF as head coach of Uzbekistan U-22 to prepare team for 2014 AFC U-22 Championship in Oman.

On 14 February 2015 he was sacked from Uzbekistan U-23 coach position.

Honours

Club
 Uzbek League (1): 1992
 Uzbek League runner-up (6): 1993, 1996, 1997, 1998, 1999, 2000
 Uzbek Cup runner-up (5): 1996, 1997, 2001, 2002, 2005

International
 Asian Games champion: 1994

Individual
 Uzbek League Top Scorer 3rd: 1993 (15 goals)
 Gennadi Krasnitsky club: 123 goals

References

External links 
Shukhrat Maqsudov player statistics at uzfootball.uz 

1970 births
Living people
People from Fergana
Pakhtakor Tashkent FK players
Soviet footballers
Uzbekistani footballers
Uzbekistan international footballers
FK Neftchi Farg'ona players
Association football forwards
Footballers at the 1994 Asian Games
Asian Games gold medalists for Uzbekistan
Asian Games medalists in football
Medalists at the 1994 Asian Games